Tephritis tatarica is a species of tephritid or fruit flies in the genus Tephritis of the family Tephritidae.

Distribution
Kirgizia, Uzbekistan.

References

Tephritinae
Insects described in 1891
Taxa named by Josef Aloizievitsch Portschinsky
Diptera of Asia